Qazian is a town in Gujar Khan Tehsil, Punjab, Pakistan. Qazian is also chief town of Union Council Qazian which is an administrative subdivision of the Tehsil. It is located near Gujar Khan which is in the Rawalpindi district

References 

Union councils of Gujar Khan Tehsil